Château des Ifs is a castle in the commune of Kientzheim, in the department of Haut-Rhin, Alsace, France. It is a listed historical monument since 1999.

References

Castles in Haut-Rhin
Monuments historiques of Haut-Rhin